Itik-itik is a mimetic folk dance in the Philippines that mimics the movement of ducks. It originated in Cantilian, Surigao del Sur in Philippines. Itik-itik was discovered in this town by National Artist for Dance Francisca Reyes-Aquino. Originating from a dance called Sibay and performed to the tune of Dejado, the story was told that an expert young dancer named Kanang at a barrio of Cantilan during a baptismal party had become so carried away with the rhythm that she began to improvise short, choppy steps similar to ducks and then splash water on their backs. The dance immediately became popular in the province for stage performances and social dancing. Later, Mr. Antonino Arreza, a native of Cantilan and a grandfather of Prospero Pichay, Jr. was believed be the one who compose the lyrics of Itik-itik. Below is original version of Itik-itik in native Cantilangnon dialect:

Itik-itik (original version) 
Itik-itik di-in kaw gikan
Itik-itik sa Pandagitan
Itik-itik nag uno didto
Itik-itik nagpupasiyo

Itik-itik unoy taghinang
Itik-itik naglangoy-langoy
Itik-itik unoy tagkita
Itik-itik suban-ong isda

Itik-itik hain kaw singod
Itik-itik ay magpahuway
Itik-itik unoy hingtungdan
Luja na an ak' kalawasan

Other popular dances who are known to have originated in Cantilan and Surigao provinces are Sumyajaw,  or Monkey Dance, Manujo-Panujo or Manobo courtship dance, the Sirong war dance.

References

External Video
The National Artists of the Philippines, Volume 1
Philippine Travel Guide
Visayan Dances
Dances of the Philippines
Culture of Surigao del Norte